Ulaanbaatar Airport may refer to:

Buyant-Ukhaa International Airport, a semi-operational airport whose services have largely been replaced by the newer airport listed below.
Chinggis Khaan International Airport, the primary airport for Ulaanbaatar and its metropolitan area.